Naeema Kishwar Khan is a Pakistani politician who had been a member of the National Assembly of Pakistan from June 2013 to May 2018.	.

Education
She has a degree in Islamic law.

Political career

She was elected to the Provincial Assembly of Khyber Pakhtunkhwa as a candidate of Jamiat Ulema-e-Islam (F) on a reserved seat for women in 2010.

She was re-elected to the National Assembly of Pakistan as a candidate of Jamiat Ulema-e-Islam (F) on a reserved seat for women from Khyber Paktunkhwa in 2013 Pakistani general election.

PILDAT gave her the title of "MNA of the Year" due to her best performance in 14th National Assembly during the third parliamentary year.

References

Living people
Pashtun women
Pakistani MNAs 2013–2018
Jamiat Ulema-e-Islam (F) politicians
Women members of the National Assembly of Pakistan
Year of birth missing (living people)
21st-century Pakistani women politicians